Kathrine Bomstad (born 3 February 1963) is a Norwegian swimmer. She was born in Narvik, and married to Ricardo Aldabe. She competed at the 1984 Summer Olympics in Los Angeles, in  200 m butterfly, 200 m medley and 400 m medley.

References

External links
 

1963 births
Living people
People from Narvik
Norwegian female medley swimmers
Olympic swimmers of Norway
Swimmers at the 1984 Summer Olympics
Norwegian female butterfly swimmers
Sportspeople from Nordland